Andrew Kevin Walker (born August 14, 1964) is an American screenwriter, producer and script doctor.  He is known for having written Seven (1995), for which he earned a nomination for the BAFTA Award for Best Original Screenplay, as well as several other films, including 8mm (1999), Sleepy Hollow (1999) and many uncredited script rewrites.

Early life and education
Walker was born in Altoona, Pennsylvania, though some time during his childhood, he moved to Mechanicsburg, Pennsylvania, where he was raised. He attended the Mechanicsburg Area Senior High School until his graduation in 1982. Walker soon enrolled in Penn State University to pursue a career in film production. He graduated from Penn State in 1986, with a Bachelor of Arts in film and video.

Film career
Shortly after completing his education, he moved to New York City and took a job at Tower Records. During that time, he worked on several projects, but Walker was unable to find much success until 1991, when he completed the script for Seven. Walker decided to move to Los Angeles to sell his screenplay. There, he personally contacted screenwriter David Koepp, who showed the script to executives at New Line Cinema, who ended up purchasing the rights to it. The film, however, took nearly three years to begin production. Christmas Vacation director Jeremiah Chechik was originally chosen to direct the optioned film but he asked for a number of modifications, including the changes to the ending, particularly the removal of the head in a box scene. Walker continued reworking the script but the film got passed around in Hollywood. The project finally went ahead when David Fincher agreed to direct the film after he read the original draft, which was accidentally sent with the ending intact.

While the project was ongoing, Walker found other work as a screenwriter, including a short stint with HBO's television series Tales From the Crypt, as well as writing two other films, Brainscan (1994) and the novel adaptation Hideaway (1995).

Seven began production between his two other films, headed by Fincher as the director and starring Morgan Freeman, Brad Pitt and Kevin Spacey. At one point during production, the studio proposed several changes — which would later become a recurring theme throughout Walker's career — deeming it too dark for its target audience. Both Fincher and Freeman backed Walker's original script, and it eventually went unchanged. The film was met with critical acclaim and enormous box office success, earning $327,311,859 worldwide. It would allow Walker to make a name for himself in the movie industry.

However, Walker would not earn another film credit to his name for another four years, though he penned several uncredited rewrites during this period, including The Game (on which he again worked with David Fincher) and Paul W. S. Anderson's Event Horizon. In 1999, Walker's 8MM finally saw the light of day, having been sold by him for a reported $1.25 million. Once again, the film's production encountered concerns regarding the dark subject matter, and the studio asked Walker to lighten the film's tone. With Joel Schumacher as director, Walker felt a rewrite would no longer be needed. But as it turned out, Schumacher supported the studio and made changes of his own, leading to a much-publicized fallout between the two, with Walker virtually disowning the film and walking away from the set. He refused to even watch the film, which became a critical failure. In an interview with The Guardian, he said that "it was such an inherently depressing experience that the very least I can do is protect myself from the miserable experience of actually watching it." In 2015, he expressed his openness to a redo 8MM instead of remaking Seven. The latter had left the studios and producers unhappy with Somerset merely standing there helpless as Mills shot John Doe.

Walker found other success in 1999, as he penned uncredited rewrites to the critical hits Stir of Echoes and Fight Club, now considered a cult classic. Walker's adaptation of Washington Irving's short story "The Legend of Sleepy Hollow" also wrapped up production as Sleepy Hollow, directed by Tim Burton. While Burton admired Walker's original script, he hired the playwright and Academy Award-winning screenwriter Tom Stoppard to tone down the violence. The film, starring Johnny Depp, was still a box office and critical success.

Since the mid-1990s, Walker wrote several screenplays that were never greenlit or have yet to go into production, such as a script for a movie starring the superhero Silver Surfer, a version of X-Men (2000; his script was written in 1994), and a film tentatively titled Batman vs. Superman. The latter film was set to go into production, but Warner Bros. opted to revive their franchises separately, and so the script was shelved. After the announcement and subsequent successes of Batman Begins and Superman Returns, the film seemed to be shelved permanently, though Wolfgang Petersen, who was due to direct the feature, had continued to express his interest in the project. That script and version of the project was permanently shelved in favor of the Zack Snyder helmed Batman v Superman: Dawn of Justice.

Walker wrote the 2016 animated dark comedy Nerdland, starring Paul Rudd and Patton Oswalt.

Walker also wrote as-yet unproduced screenplays for the American version of The Girl Who Played with Fire and a remake of The Reincarnation of Peter Proud, both for Seven director David Fincher, as well as a new version of Ernest Hemingway's The Killers.

Other projects
Walker also wrote two shorts for the BMW Films series The Hire, starring Clive Owen: Ambush, directed by John Frankenheimer, and The Follow, by Wong Kar-wai.

Walker also co-wrote (with David Self and Paul Attanasio) the screenplay for The Wolfman, a remake of the Universal Studios classic. The remake, directed by Joe Johnston and starring Benicio del Toro in the title role, received a 2010 release.

Amazon named Walker's 2015 Kindle Single, Old Man Johnson (his first novel) among its "Best of the Year."

Appearances in film

Walker is known for making short cameos in films for which he served as a writer. In Panic Room, he appears as a sleepy neighbor; in Fight Club, three detectives are named, respectively, Andrew, Kevin and Walker; and in Seven, he is the corpse near the very beginning of the movie.

Filmography

Film
As Writer

As script doctor
 Event Horizon (1997)
 The Game (1997)
 Fight Club (1999)
 Stir of Echoes (1999)

Other credits

Television

References

External links

1964 births
American male screenwriters
Annie Award winners
Donald P. Bellisario College of Communications alumni
Living people
People from Mechanicsburg, Pennsylvania
Screenwriters from Pennsylvania